The Best of Taj Mahal, Volume 1 is a blues compilation album by American Taj Mahal.

Track listing
 "Leaving Trunk" – 4:51
 "She Caught the Katy and Left Me a Mule to Ride" - 3:30
 "Fishing Blues" - 3:06
 "Farther On Down the Road" - 3:22
 "You're Going to Need Somebody on Your Bond" - 6:17
 "Cakewalk Into Town" - 2:33
 "Chevrolet" - 2:42
 "Johnny Too Bad" - 3:15
 "Take a Giant Step" - 4:18 (Carole King, Gerry Goffin)
 "Ain't Gwine Whistle Dixie (Any Mo')" - 8:28

 Produced by Taj Mahal
 Produced by David Rubinson for the Fillmore Corporation

Personnel
 Taj Mahal

References

Taj Mahal (musician) compilation albums
1981 greatest hits albums
Columbia Records compilation albums